Gerda Rieser-Cegnar (sometimes listed as Gerda Cegner-Reiser) is an Austrian luger who competed in the early 1960s. She won the silver medal in the women's singles event at the 1962 FIL World Luge Championships in Krynica, Poland.

Rieser-Cegnar also won a bronze medal in the women's singles event at the 1962 FIL European Luge Championships in Weissenbach, Austria.

References
Hickok sports information on World champions in luge and skeleton.
List of European luge champions 
SportQuick.com information on World champions in luge 

Austrian female lugers
Possibly living people
Year of birth missing
20th-century Austrian women